Emiliano Bergamaschi (born 4 May 1976) is an Argentine rugby union coach and former player. He is the Assistant head coach of the Zebre who compete in United Rugby Championship.

Playing career
During his playing career, Bergamaschi was a prop. Bergamaschi spent spells playing in England for both Bristol and Saracens, as well as playing in France for Rouen.

Coaching
Following his retirement, Bergamaschi went into coaching. In 2020, he was assistant to Raúl Pérez at the Olímpia Lions in the 2020 Súper Liga Americana de Rugby season. In January 2021, he was appointed head coach of the Cobras Brasil XV team for the 2021 Súper Liga Americana de Rugby season.
From January 2022 to April 2022 he was interim Head coach of Zebre.

References

External links
itsrugby Profile

1976 births
Living people
Bristol Bears players
Saracens F.C. players
Argentine rugby union players
Argentina international rugby union players
Argentine rugby union coaches
Rugby union props
Sportspeople from Rosario, Santa Fe